West Moreton was an electoral district for the Legislative Assembly in the Australian state of New South Wales created for the July 1859 election, partly replacing Stanley County in the Moreton Bay region around Brisbane. It was abolished in December 1859 with the establishment of Queensland as a separate colony.

Members for West Moreton

Election results

1859

References

Former electoral districts of New South Wales
Electoral districts of New South Wales in the area of Queensland
History of Queensland
Constituencies established in 1859
Constituencies disestablished in 1859
1859 establishments in Australia
1859 disestablishments in Australia